Władysław Kowalski (17 April 1897 – 21 September 1939) was a Polish footballer. He played in four matches for the Poland national football team from 1923 to 1924. A Polish Army officer, serving as an adjutant, Kowalski was taken prisoner during the Soviet invasion of Poland, when trying to flee to Hungary, and was executed by Soviet soldiers.

References

External links
 

1897 births
1939 deaths
Polish footballers
Poland international footballers
Association footballers not categorized by position
Footballers from Kraków
Polish Army officers
Polish military personnel killed in World War II
Polish prisoners of war in World War II
World War II prisoners of war held by the Soviet Union
Polish people executed by the Soviet Union
Extrajudicial killings in World War II
People executed by the Soviet Union by firing squad